plays rugby union at fullback (and sometimes centre) for Suntory Sungoliath in the Top League. He also plays at fullback for the Japan national rugby union team.

He was selected for the Japanese 2007 Rugby World Cup squad and made 2 appearances.

Aruga attended Kanto Gakuin University.

He has scored 9 tries and 11 conversions for Japan.

References

1983 births
Living people
Japanese rugby union players
Japan international rugby union players
Japan international rugby sevens players
Male rugby sevens players
Rugby union fullbacks
Tokyo Sungoliath players